HMS Carnarvon was one of six  armoured cruisers built for the Royal Navy in the first decade of the 20th century. She was assigned to the 3rd Cruiser Squadron of the Mediterranean Fleet upon completion in 1905 and was transferred to the 2nd Cruiser Squadron of the Atlantic Fleet in 1907. She was assigned to the reserve Third Fleet in 1909 and became flagship of the 5th Cruiser Squadron of the reserve Second Fleet in 1912.

When World War I began in August 1914, she was assigned to the Cape Verde Station to search for German commerce raiders while protecting British shipping. Carnarvon was transferred to the South Atlantic two months later and assigned to the squadron that destroyed the German East Asia Squadron at the Battle of the Falklands. She was assigned to the North America and West Indies Station in 1915 and continued to patrol against German raiders and escort convoys to the end of the war. In 1919, she became a training ship and was then sold for scrap in 1921.

Design and description
Carnarvon was designed to displace . The engines were powered by seventeen Niclausse and six cylindrical boilers.

Her main armament consisted of four breech-loading (BL) 7.5-inch Mk I guns mounted in four single-gun turrets, one each fore and aft of the superstructure and one on each side. Her secondary armament of six BL 6-inch Mk VII guns was arranged in casemates amidships. Four of these were mounted on the main deck and were only usable in calm weather. Carnarvon also carried eighteen quick-firing (QF) 3-pounder Hotchkiss guns and two submerged 18-inch torpedo tubes. Her two 12-pounder 8 cwt guns could be dismounted for service ashore.

At some point in the war, the main deck six-inch guns of the Devonshire-class ships were moved to the upper deck and given gun shields. Their casemates were plated over to improve seakeeping and the four 3-pounder guns displaced by the transfer were landed.

The armour of the gun turrets was also five inches thick whilst that of their barbettes was six inches thick.

Construction and service

Carnarvon, named to commemorate the Welsh county, was laid down by William Beardmore & Company at their Dalmuir shipyard on 1 October 1902 and launched on 7 October 1903. She was completed on 29 May 1905 and was initially assigned to the 3rd Cruiser Squadron of the Mediterranean Fleet. She was transferred to the 2nd Cruiser Squadron of the Atlantic Fleet in June 1907 and was then assigned to the reserve Third Fleet at Devonport in April 1909. The ship was transferred to the Second Fleet at Devonport in March 1912 and subsequently became the flagship of the 5th Cruiser Squadron until the start of World War I. She participated in the fleet manoeuvres in July–August 1913 as well as those in July 1914. On 31 July, a few days before war was declared on Germany, she encountered the German light cruiser  in the English Channel returning home and the two ships saluted each other.

When news of the outbreak of hostilities was received on 5 August, Carnarvon, now the flagship of Rear Admiral Archibald Stoddart, was at sea, making for the Canary Islands from Gibraltar. She was quickly sent to Cape Verde and captured the German merchant ship  on 23 August 1914. She escorted her prize to Freetown, Sierra Leone for disposal and resumed patrolling. She moved to the Brazilian coast in October and then proceeded to the Falkland Islands with the squadron commanded by Vice-Admiral Doveton Sturdee.

Battle of the Falklands

Upon arrival at Port Stanley on 7 December, Sturdee informed his captains that he planned to recoal the entire squadron the following day from the two available colliers and to begin the search for the East Asia Squadron, believed to be running for home around the tip of South America, the day after. Vice-Admiral Maximilian von Spee, commander of the German squadron, had other plans and intended to destroy the radio station at Port Stanley on the morning of 8 December. The appearance of two German ships at 07:30 caught Sturdee's ships by surprise, but the Germans were driven off by  shells fired by the predreadnought battleship  when they came within range around 09:20. Carnarvon completed recoaling at 08:00 and the squadron cleared the harbour by 10:30. Sturdee ordered "general chase" at that time, but Carnarvon could only manage  and fell behind the other British ships. His two battlecruisers were the fastest ships present and inexorably began to close on the German cruisers, opening fire at 12:55 that straddled the light cruiser , the rear ship in the German formation. It was clear to Spee that his ships could not outrun the battlecruisers and that the only hope for any of his ships to survive was to scatter. So he turned his two armoured cruisers around to buy time by engaging the battlecruisers and ordered his three light cruisers to disperse at 13:20. Carnarvon, now  behind, had no hope of catching the scattering German ships and continued to trail the battlecruisers.

Carnarvon finally came within range of the German armoured cruisers and opened fire shortly before  rolled over and capsized at 16:17. She then engaged  until Sturdee ordered "cease fire" at 17:50. The German captain had started to scuttle his ship 10 minutes earlier when it was clear that the situation was hopeless and his ship sank at 18:00. Carnarvon rescued 20 survivors from Gneisenau, but only wreckage was visible when she later steamed through the area where Scharnhorst had sunk.

After the battle she participated in the hunt for the light cruiser  that had escaped during the battle and investigated anchorages in Argentina, Chile and the island of South Georgia before proceeding north to Brazil in February. She struck a coral reef off the Abrolhos Archipelago on 22 February 1915 and had to be beached to avoid sinking. The ship received temporary repairs at Rio de Janeiro the following month. Carnarvon received permanent repairs in Montreal, Canada, from May to July after which she escorted several British H-class submarines from Halifax to the United Kingdom en route to Devonport. She then returned to Halifax where she was based for the rest of the year. Now assigned to the North America and West Indies Station, with its main base at the Royal Naval Dockyard in the Imperial fortress colony of Bermuda, she resumed her duties protecting British shipping for the rest of the war. After the United States Navy destroyer USS Stewart grounded at Bermuda on 16 August 1917, a cricket team from Carnarvon played a match against one from Stewart at the Bermuda dockyard. In 1919, she began serving as a cadet training ship, remaining in that role until she was listed for sale in March 1921. Carnarvon was sold for scrap on 8 November 1921 and subsequently broken up in Germany.

Notes

Footnotes

Bibliography

Further reading

External links
 HMS Carnarvon Memoir 1914–1915 – annotated transcript of a diary kept by George H. J. Hanks, a sick bay attendant.

Devonshire-class cruisers (1903)
Ships built on the River Clyde
1903 ships
World War I cruisers of the United Kingdom